Balfour Beatty Infrastructure, Inc. is a heavy civil contractor operating in the United States. Established in North America in 1990, the company constructs highways, bridges (over land and water), tunnels, wastewater and potable water treatment plants. Its parent company is Balfour Beatty plc.

References

External links 
 Balfour Beatty Infrastructure, Inc. Official Site
 Balfour Beatty plc Official Site

Engineering companies of the United States
Construction and civil engineering companies of the United States
Companies based in Atlanta